Marcus Holman (born May 2, 1991, Baltimore, Maryland, United States) is an American professional lacrosse player for Cannons Lacrosse Club of the Premier Lacrosse League and an assistant coach for the Utah Utes men's lacrosse team. Holman was an attackman for the University of North Carolina Tar Heels. He was UNC's all-time leading scorer until Joey Sankey surpassed him during the 2015 season.

Holman's father, Brian, coached UNC's goalkeepers and helps coordinate the defense. He joined head coach Joe Breschi in his first year at Chapel Hill in 2009. More recently, Brian Holman took over as head coach of lacrosse at University of Utah.  Marcus' older brother, Matthew, was a goalkeeper for the Tar Heels in 2011 and 2012. His mother is the Director of Operations for the North Carolina Tar Heels women's lacrosse team, which his sister Sydney has played for since 2014 lacrosse season.

Early years
Holman attended Gilman School in Baltimore and the lacrosse team he played on was ranked No. 1 by Inside Lacrosse in 2009 in Holman's senior year, when he was the team's MVP and captain. He was also a captain of his high school football team in his senior year.

College career

In Holman’s freshman year, he won the ACC Freshman of the Year award in 2010.  He switched from attack to midfield as a sophomore.  His teammates voted him UNC's most valuable player in 2011 and 2012. He was also a second-team All-American in 2012.  He was named to the 2013 All-ACC team by the ACC coaches on 24 April 2013. The 2013 season was Holman's second consecutive year on the All-ACC team. Holman became the Tar Heels' all-time leading scorer on 28 April 2013 when he surpassed the previous school record of 204 set by Bruce Ledwith (1970–73).

College statistics

Four ACC Men Named as Tewaaraton Nominees

Tewaaraton Award
Holman was a nominee for the Tewaaraton Award in 2012 and 2013. There were 13 other attackmen on the nominee list in 2013, including the winner from the previous year, attackman Peter Baum from Colgate, and a repeat finalist, Mike Sawyer, an attackman from Loyola University.

Major League Lacrosse
The Ohio Machine selected Holman in the second round of the Major League Lacrosse draft.

Holman played 6 seasons with the Machine and 81 games. He was the 2017 MLL Championship MVP scoring 4 goals with 2 assists leading the Machine to their 1st MLL Championship. He finished his MLL Career with 208 Goals (12th All Time), 87 assists, and 302 total points (16th All Time.)

MLL Statistics

Premier Lacrosse League
In 2019, Holman joined the Archers Lacrosse Club of Paul Rabil’s new league called the Premier Lacrosse League. He was selected to the 2019 PLL All-Star Game, playing for Team Baptiste.

Holman signed as a free agent with Cannons Lacrosse Club ahead of the 2023 season.

Holman is represented by Athelo Group, a sports agency based out of Stamford, Connecticut.

PLL Statistics

References

1991 births
Living people
North Carolina Tar Heels men's lacrosse players
Premier Lacrosse League players
Lacrosse players from Baltimore
Ohio Machine players
Utah Utes coaches
American lacrosse coaches
College lacrosse coaches in the United States